Torre de las Telecomunicaciones (Telecommunications Tower) or Torre Joaquín Torres García (Joaquín Torres García Tower), usually referred as Antel Tower, is a 157 meter tall building with 35 floors located in Montevideo, Uruguay. 

It hosts the headquarters of Uruguay's government-owned telecommunications company, ANTEL, and is the tallest skyscraper in the country. Designed by the Uruguayan-Canadian architect Carlos Ott, it is situated by the side of the Bay of Montevideo. The tower was completed by American Bridge and other design/built consortium team members in 2002.

Description
With a total area of 19.459 m², the complex consists of the main tower, the Customer Service Building, the Telecommunications Museum and the Auditorium. 
There are guided visits all through the week.

Controversy 
When its construction was announced, many politicians complained about its cost ($40 million, plus $25 million for the construction of the other 5 buildings of the Telecommunications Complex).

Problems during its construction turned the original $65 million into $102 million.

See also 
ANTEL
Communications in Uruguay
American Bridge Company
List of tallest buildings in Uruguay

References

External links 

 
American Bridge, participant in the construction
Guided Tours in the building

Office buildings completed in 2002
Buildings and structures in Montevideo
Carlos Ott buildings
Aguada, Montevideo
2002 establishments in Uruguay